Maja brachydactyla is a species of crab in the family Majidae. It was initially described as a subspecies of M. squinado. A review of the species complex published in 1998 was able to differentiate between specimens from the Mediterranean Sea and those from the Atlantic Ocean, and concluded that the Atlantic specimens were a separate species, accepted as M. brachydactyla Balss, 1922.

References 

Majoidea
Crustaceans described in 1922